Oplismenopsis is a genus of South American plants in the grass family. The only known species is Oplismenopsis najada, native to southern Brazil, Uruguay, and northeastern Argentina.

References

External links
 Grassbase - The World Online Grass Flora

Panicoideae
Monotypic Poaceae genera
Flora of South America